Jacob Charles Dowell (born March 4, 1985) is an American former professional ice hockey center who played in the National Hockey League (NHL) with the Chicago Blackhawks, Dallas Stars and Minnesota Wild.

Playing career
Dowell grew up in Eau Claire, Wisconsin and played for Memorial High School in Eau Claire for two seasons, totaling 90 points. In both seasons, Dowell helped lead the Old Abes to sectional championships and state tournament berths.

Dowell left Memorial High School to be a part of the USA Hockey U-18 Developmental Program in Ann Arbor, Michigan in the year 2001. Later, Dowell returned to Wisconsin to play college hockey for the Wisconsin Badgers where he won a National Championship. Dowell was selected in the fifth round of the 2004 NHL Entry Draft by the Chicago Blackhawks.

Dowell signed a contract with Chicago in July 2007. On November 23, 2007, Dowell scored a short-handed goal in his first NHL game, a 2–1 win over the Calgary Flames. Dowell broke his foot the next game, but recovered from the injury to play 17 more games in the 2007–08 season.

Dowell was only called up to play in one contest in the 2008–09 season. He was on the Blackhawks active roster against Vancouver and Detroit in the playoffs, but he did not play.

During the 2009–10 season, Dowell played three games for the Hawks.

On July 1, 2011, the Dallas Stars announced that the club had agreed to terms with center Dowell on a one-year contract worth $800,000. During the 2011–12 season, Dowell played in 52 games contributing with 2 goals and 7 points.

On July 4, 2012, Dowell signed a two-year free agent contract with the Minnesota Wild. Over the duration of his contract with the Wild, Dowell amassed just 3 games, whilst primarily playing with AHL affiliates, the Houston Aeros and the Iowa Wild.

On July 28, 2014, Dowell signed a one-year free agent contract with the Hamilton Bulldogs of the American Hockey League.

On August 31, 2015, Dowell signed a professional tryout contract in returning to attend the Rockford IceHogs training camp for the 2015–16 season. After 5 games with the IceHogs on October 22, 2015, Dowell was signed to an AHL contract to continue in Rockford for the remainder of the season.

After captaining the IceHogs in the 2016–17 season, and posting 15 points in 66 games, Dowell as a free agent opted to sign his first contact abroad in agreeing to a one-year deal with Austrian club, EHC Black Wings Linz of the EBEL, on May 12, 2017.

Personal
Dowell and his family have worked to raise awareness and find a cure for Huntington's disease, a disease which has afflicted his brother and his father. The Dowells host fundraisers to battle the disease. Dowell himself has tested negative for Huntington's. For his work to cure Huntington's while still committing to playing hockey, Dowell was awarded the Fred T. Hunt Memorial Award during the 2013–14 season.

Dowell is married to his wife, Carly, together they have one daughter and one son.

Career statistics

Regular season and playoffs

International

Awards and honors

References

External links

Jake's High School Hockey Page at Eau Claire High School Hockey

1985 births
Living people
American men's ice hockey centers
Chicago Blackhawks draft picks
Chicago Blackhawks players
Dallas Stars players
EHC Black Wings Linz players
Hamilton Bulldogs (AHL) players
Houston Aeros (1994–2013) players
Ice hockey players from Wisconsin
Iowa Wild players
Minnesota Wild players
Norfolk Admirals players
Sportspeople from Eau Claire, Wisconsin
Rockford IceHogs (AHL) players
USA Hockey National Team Development Program players
Wisconsin Badgers men's ice hockey players